Macroschisma megatrema is a species of sea snail, a marine gastropod mollusk in the family Fissurellidae, the keyhole limpets and slit limpets.

Distribution
This species occurs off the following locations:
 Aldabra

References

External links
 To World Register of Marine Species

megatrema
Gastropods described in 1851